Boule et Bill is a televised French-language cartoon series produced in Canada (as a Canada-France co-production) in 2004. It is based on the popular Belgian comic Boule et Bill. It has aired on the channel Unis since 2015. It is the third animated adaptation, the first airing in the year 1960 on the channel Radiodiffusion-Télévision Française and the second airing in 2000 on the channel TFO. There is also a fourth TV series produced in 2006 that has aired on TOU.TV since 2014.

It is distributed internationally be Dargaud Distribution, and copyrighted in 2004 by Dargaud-Marina and Bel Ombre Films and TéléTOON/TPS Jeunesse. It is a Tooncan XXIII Inc. production.

Staff
It is produced by Gaspard de Chavagnac and Paul Cadieux. It is co-produced by Patrick Dedieu. Administrative production by Judith Serfaty, assistant-produced by Ingrid Libercier and Jennifer Regent.

It is directed by Francis Nielsen, with additional direction by Francois Sasseville-Dargaud-Marina and Carine Neant and Muriel Achery and Didier Lejuene and Davia Orsatelle.

The graphics adaptation is done by Remi Lasfargeas of Acacia Studio - La Faktory. Also by Seahorse Productions, with artistic director responsible for design Serge Cicerone and Bernard le Gall supervising storyboards.  The animation is done by Hong-Guang Animation Suzhou, with associated producer George Chang and assistant producer Mandy Le, coordinating producers Linus Lee and Sophie Huang, and animation supervisors SKinny Wen, Anthony Wang, Max Ma, Denis Du, Jack Zhou, and Sunny Sun.

Music is by Laurent Cayol, Francois Monfeuga, Jacques Bastello, and Olivier Lanneluc. Musical editing is done by Dargaud-Marina - Emi Virgin Music Publishing.

Additional work by Laurent-Christophe de Ruelle and Nathalie Coupal and Kun Jalabet.

Plot
The story focuses on a suburban family in Brussels in the 1960s.

Characters
Boule/Billy is the boy
Bill/Buddy is his dog
Pierre is his dad
his mother is also there
Mouf is a friend of Boule/Billy
Plum is a girlfriend of Boule/Billy

Episodes

air dates listed to right of episodes are original air dates on Unis, their earlier debut dates on TF1 still need to be located as the overall original air date, at which point the Unis runs can be demoted to alt-date
There are one hundred and four episodes.

Numbers TBD:
Camping sauvage 12 December 2015
Un amour d'instituteur 15 December 2015
La greve 16 December 2015
Vitalis perd la boule 17 December 2015
Boule de bois 18 December 2015
Les Tarties 19 December 2015
Lecon de seduction 22 December 2015
La Saint-Valentin 23 December 2015
Bill A Boa 24 December 2015
Un Noel extra 25 December 2015
Partie de chasse 29 December 2015
Quelle vie de poulet 30 December 2015
Le correspondent 31 December 2015
Transmission de pensees 1 January 2016
S.O.S. nid en detresse 3 March 2016
L'ouef de Caroline 7 March 2016 (possibly debuted 5 May 2014 on unknown channel)

Numbers determined, OADs TBD:
1: Au régime
104: Plein les yeux

References

2000s Canadian animated television series
2000s French animated television series
Canadian children's animated television series
French children's animated television series
Unis original programming
Animated television series about families
Television series based on Belgian comics